Ludwig Fischer (1905–1947) was a Nazi war criminal

Ludwig Fischer may also refer to:
 Ludwig Fischer (racing driver) (1915–1991), German racing driver
 Ludwig Fischer (botanist) (1828–1907), Swiss botanist
 Ludwig Fischer (bass) (1745–1825), German opera singer
 Ludwig Hans Fischer (1848–1915), Austrian landscape painter and etcher